Adrian Fontes (born April 3, 1970) is an American politician, election official, veteran, and attorney. A member of the Democratic Party, he has served as the Secretary of State of Arizona since 2023, after defeating Republican nominee Mark Finchem in 2022. Fontes previously served as the Maricopa County Recorder from 2017 to 2021.

Early life and career 
Fontes was raised in Nogales, Arizona. His family has lived in southern Arizona for more than 300 years, even before Arizona became a state. Fontes served in the United States Marine Corps from 1992 to 1996, where he taught a marksmanship course. He earned his bachelor's degree in Communications from Arizona State University in 1998. When he returned, he pursued a Juris Doctor degree.

Fontes has served as a prosecutor with the Denver District Attorney's Office, Maricopa County Attorney's Office and the Arizona Attorney General's Office, and as an attorney in private practice.

Maricopa County Recorder (2017–2021)

Elections

2016 
Fontes ran for Maricopa County Recorder against 28-year incumbent Helen Purcell. Fontes announced his candidacy the day after Maricopa County's 2016 presidential preference election, which was perceived by some as having been mismanaged by Purcell due to the reduction in the number of polling places in the county, causing long lines that stretched for blocks and left some voters waiting for hours. Latino community leaders raised concerns about voter suppression when areas with predominantly Latino populations had one or no polling places open during Arizona's presidential preference election. On October 27, 2016, the Arizona Republic newspaper endorsed Fontes. On November 14, 2016, Purcell conceded the race. Fontes was the first Democrat to be elected Maricopa County Recorder in over 50 years.

2020 
Fontes ran for re-election in 2020, losing by less than 5,000 votes to Republican candidate Stephen Richer.

Tenure 
As Maricopa County Recorder, Fontes piloted the use of vote centers, where any voter in the county could cast a ballot regardless of precinct. In the November 2018 election, Maricopa County operated 40 vote centers. Fontes also expanded early voting options in Maricopa County.

As the County Recorder, Fontes oversaw the counting of ballots in Maricopa County's elections in 2020. While the ballots were being counted in the Maricopa County Recorder's Office, 
protesters gathered outside over the course of several days, including conspiracy theorist Alex Jones. Fontes worried that there would be an invasion into the building, and met with sheriff's department and other law-enforcement agencies about establishing a secure perimeter around the building where Fontes' staff was counting ballots but was determined there was no real threat.<ref name="auto1" / Due to the unrest Maricopa County Recorder's Office, Fontes and his family packed "go-bags" in case they needed to leave their home on short notice, found back-up housing, and his children evacuated for several days. Fontes has claimed that Jake Angeli, the "QAnon Shaman," was one of the protestors at the Recorders Office. After the 2020 election, Fontes joined Pima County Recorder-elect Gabriella Cázares-Kelly's transition team as an interim chief deputy recorder after losing his re-election.

Criticism of 2021 Maricopa County election audit 
Fontes was a vocal critic of the Maricopa County election audit. On July 28, 2021, Fontes was one of several politicians, experts and election officials spoke about voter suppression, subversion, and election worker intimidation who testified before the United States Congress Committee on House Administration. Fontes testified: "I strongly support legislative efforts to protect election officials in Arizona and across the country from harassment, intimidation, threats and political interference, so that they can safely perform their duties to serve voters and protect election integrity."

Arizona Secretary of State (2023–present) 
On July 6, 2021, Fontes announced his candidacy for the 2022 Arizona Secretary of State election. On August 4, 2022, Fontes was declared the winner of the Democratic primary. Fontes received 52.5% of the vote, while his opponent Reginald Bolding received 47.5%. Fontes faced Republican party nominee, Arizona Representative Mark Finchem in the general election. Finchem had contended without evidence that Maricopa County’s 2020 election was tainted by fraud, backed the state Senate’s discredited review of the election done by the state Senate and was part of a lawsuit which attempted to block the use of vote counting machines in state elections. Fontes defeated Finchem in the November 8 general election.

Electoral history

Maricopa County Recorder

2016

2020

Arizona Secretary of State

2022

See also 
 Hispanics in the United States Marine Corps

References 

 

 

1970 births
21st-century American lawyers
21st-century American politicians
20th-century American military personnel
American lawyers of Mexican descent
American politicians of Mexican descent
Arizona Democrats
Arizona lawyers
Arizona State University alumni
County officials in Arizona
Hispanic and Latino American military personnel
Hispanic and Latino American people in Arizona politics
Living people
People from Nogales, Arizona
Secretaries of State of Arizona
Sturm College of Law alumni
United States Marines